Mark  Clapham (born 1976) is a British author, best known for writing fiction and reference books for television series, in particular relating to Doctor Who (and its spin-offs) and Warhammer 40,000.

Writing
Clapham started out writing Doctor Who fan fiction and, through Seventh Door Fanzines, began to work with Lance Parkin. Notable fan fiction work included Integration, a novella in Seventh Door's Odyssey series, edited by Parkin.

Having been asked to write a New Adventure (a Bernice Summerfield novel for Virgin Publishing) for the November 1998 slot, Parkin found himself too busy with other commitments to write a book on his own and, with editor Rebecca Levene's blessing, brought in Clapham as a co-author. Between them, the two devised Beige Planet Mars, a campus mystery novel set at a Mars University. Clapham was later offered the final Virgin Benny slot and, with a tight deadline, brought in Jon de Burgh Miller as his co-writer on Twilight of the Gods.

Clapham went on to co-write The Taking of Planet 5 with Simon Bucher-Jones in the BBC's Doctor Who novel line, before eventually writing his first solo novel for the line, Hope. He wrote a comic in Accent UK's Zombies anthology. He edited Secret Histories, a Bernice Summerfield anthology.

He has written non-fiction, both reference books for TV (often with Jim Smith) and magazine work, notably for the official Xena: Warrior Princess magazine. With Smith and Eddie Robson, he wrote Who's Next: An Unofficial Guide to Doctor Who.

He later wrote official fiction in the Warhammer 40,000 universe.

Bibliography

Bernice Summerfield

Virgin
 Beige Planet Mars, with Lance Parkin
 Twilight of the Gods, with Jon de Burgh Miller

Big Finish
 Secret Histories, editor and linking material
 "In the Ledgers of Madness", short story in Present Danger
 "The Seventh Fanfic", short story in In Time
 Venus Mantrap, with Lance Parkin; audio drama, 2009
 "Tap", short audio drama, in The Christmas Collection

Doctor Who
 The Taking of Planet 5, with Simon Bucher-Jones, 1999
 Hope, 2002
 "A Town Called Eternity", with Lance Parkin; short story in Short Trips and Side Steps

Iris Wildthyme
 "Channel 666", short story in The Panda Book of Horror
 "Lilac Mars", with Lance Parkin; short story in Iris Wildthyme of Mars

Warhammer 40K
 "Sanctified", short story in Fear the Alien
 "In Hrondir's Tomb, short story in Hammer and Bolter issue 20; re-published online, ISBN 9781785723001
 Iron Guard, novel, July 2012 as ebook, ISBN 9780857877543; 2013 as paperback, ISBN 9781849704991
 Le Garde de Fer (French edition), 2015
 "The Siege of Fellguard", short story published online in December 2013
 "The Hour of Hell", short story published online in December 2013 (sequel to "The Siege of Fellguard")
 "Blood of Sanguinius", short story published online in December 2014, ISBN 978-1-78251-830-3
 "Hollow Beginnings", short story published online in August 2015, ISBN 9781785721786
 "Deathwatch: The Known Unknown", short story published online in February 2016
 Tyrant of the Hollow Worlds, novel, December 2016
 Le Tyran des Mondes Creux (French edition), 2017
 Der Tyrann der Hohlwelten (German edition), 2017

Other fiction
 Dead Stop, novella, Abaddon Books, 2014
 Black Plasma Adventures, with David Zoellner, graphic novel, 2020

Non-fiction
 Soul Searching: The Unofficial Guide to the Life and Trials of Ally McBeal, with Jim Smith, 2000
 Ally McBeal. Le Guide Non Officiel de la Série (French edition), 2001
 Small Town, Strange World: An Unofficial and Unauthorised Guide to Smallville, 2003
 Secret Identities - An Unofficial and Unauthorised Guide to Alias, with Lance Parkin, 2003
 Who's Next: An Unofficial and Unauthorised Guide to Doctor Who: An Unofficial & Unauthorised Guide to Dr Who, with Eddie Robson and Jim Smith, 2005

References

External links
Shiny Shelf website
Blog

1976 births
Living people
Alumni of University College London
British science fiction writers
British male novelists
21st-century British short story writers
21st-century British male writers
20th-century British male writers
20th-century British novelists
Writers of Doctor Who novels